Chimen Abramsky (12 September 1916 – 14 March 2010) was emeritus professor of Jewish studies at University College London. His first name is pronounced Shimon.

Biography 
Abramsky was born in Minsk to a Lithuanian Jewish family on 12 September 1916, the son of Rabbi Yehezkel Abramsky. He gained a BA degree from the Hebrew University of Jerusalem and an MA from the University of Oxford. He was Reader in Jewish History, then Goldsmid Professor of Hebrew and Jewish Studies at University College London. He was a Senior Fellow at St Antony's College, Oxford. A noted scholar of Jewish History, Abramsky was also well known as an expert of antiquarian Hebrew books and manuscripts, and was professionally consulted for many years by the auction house Sotheby's, which traditionally ran one Hebraica and Judaica auction every year.

In 1936, while studying at the Hebrew University in Jerusalem, he became involved in socialist campus politics and on one occasion, he recalled being beaten up by the future Israeli prime minister, Yitzhak Shamir – then a leading figure in the rightwing Irgun. He was described as an atheist.

Abramsky would visit London in the Summer of 1939 to see his parents, he would be unable to return to the Palestinian Mandate throughout World War 2 because of this; during this time he would meet and marry Miriam  (1917–1997). He would meet her at her parents' store Shapiro Vallentine, a prominent publisher of Jewish scholarly books. They had two children, Jack and Jenny, the latter of whom became a senior employee for the BBC. Jack, a mathematician, is the father of Sasha Abramsky. The house Chimen and Miriam shared in Highgate, Northern London, was considered an important destination for thinkers and scholars.

In 1966, he was invited to take up a newly created lectureship in modern Jewish history at University College London.

In a well-known incident, Abramsky once hosted the Japanese crown prince  and Hebrew scholar Prince Takahito Mikasa at the University College London's Institute of Jewish Studies in 1975.

Abramsky died on 14 March 2010.

Works  
 Sasha Abramsky: The house of twenty thousand books. London : Halban, 2014

See also 
 List of British Jews

References

External links
 The Jewish Year Book, 2005, p. 217
 
  
 Davidzon, Vladislav (February 18, 2015) 'Chimen Abramsky’s House of Twenty Thousand Books'   Tablet Magazine. Retrieved 15 December 2015

1916 births
2010 deaths
Place of death missing
20th-century atheists
Academics of the Oxford Centre for Hebrew and Jewish Studies
Academics of University College London
Alumni of St Antony's College, Oxford
Belarusian emigrants to the United Kingdom
20th-century Belarusian Jews
British bibliophiles
British people of Belarusian-Jewish descent
Fellows of St Antony's College, Oxford
Hebrew University of Jerusalem alumni
Judaic scholars
People from Minsky Uyezd
Professorships in literature
Soviet emigrants to Mandatory Palestine